Tachigali tessmannii is a species of leguminous species of tree in the family Fabaceae. It is found only in Peru.

References

Caesalpinioideae
Flora of Peru
Data deficient plants
Taxonomy articles created by Polbot